Manrico Ronchiato (born 28 October 1960) is a former Italian racing cyclist. He finished in last place in the 1985 Tour de France.

References

External links
 

1960 births
Living people
Italian male cyclists
Cyclists from the Metropolitan City of Venice
People from Jesolo